Olmi may refer to:

People
 Christina Olmi (born 1984), American beauty queen
 Ermanno Olmi (1931–2018), Italian film director
 Renato Olmi (1914–1985), Italian footballer
 Véronique Olmi (born 1962), French playwright and novelist

See also
 Olmi-Cappella, Haute-Corse, France
 Pieve d'Olmi, Cremona, Lombardy, Italy